Cachi may refer to:

 Cachi, Argentina
Cachi Department, Argentina
Cachi, Costa Rica
Lake Cachi, Costa Rica

See also 
 Cachy, a commune in France
 Kachi (disambiguation)